SLB Acquisition Holdings, LLC is a consortium based in St. Louis, Missouri. It was founded in 2012 by American businessman Thomas H. Stillman and 15 local investors including the former US UN ambassador and senator John C. Danforth.

History
On May 10, 2012 , it became clear that SLB Acquisition Holdings, LLC had acquired St. Louis Blues, the Peoria Rivermen, the lease and daily care of Enterprise Center, as well as a majority stake in Stifel Theatre from SCP Worldwide for a purchase price of $ 130 million.

Stillman later spun off the Peoria Riverman to Canucks Sports & Entertainment who relocated them to Utica, New York as the Utica Comets.

Assets 
 St. Louis Blues – (NHL)
 Enterprise Center – Operations only, the City of St. Louis is the owner
 Stifel Theatre – Majority Owner

Former assets
 Peoria Rivermen – (AHL)

Shareholders

Majority Owner 
 Thomas H. Stillman - Chairman of the Board & CEO, Summit Distributing.

Minority Owners 
 James A. Cooper - CEO, Thompson Street Capital Partners.
 Christopher B. Danforth - Owner and President, Kennelwood Pet Resorts.
 John C. Danforth - Shareholder, Bryan Cave, LLP. Danforth was former senator of the state of Missouri & US UN ambassador.
 James L. Johnson - Senior Vice President , Stifel Nicolaus & Co.
 James P. Kavanaugh - CEO, World Wide Technology, Inc.
 Jerald L. Kent - Chairman and CEO, TierPoint, LLC & CEO, Cequel III.
 Donn S. Lux - Chairman of the Board & CEO, Luxco.
 W. Stephen Maritz - Chairman of the Board, Maritz Inc.
 Scott B. McCuaig - Former President , Stifel Nicolaus & Co.
 Edward M. Potter - Private Investor.
 John S. Ross, Jr. - President, Summit Development Group.
 Thomas F. Schlafly - Co-owner, Thompson Coburn & Founder, The Saint Louis Brewery.
 David L. Steward - Chairman of the Board, World Wide Technology, Inc.
 Andrew C. Taylor - Chairman of the Board & CEO, Enterprise Holdings, Inc.
 Jo-Ann Taylor Kindle - President, Enterprise Holdings Foundation.

References

Sports holding companies of the United States
Companies established in 2012
2012 establishments in Missouri
National Hockey League owners
St. Louis Blues owners